Port Isaac's Fisherman's Friends is the third album from the Cornwall-based folk music group Fisherman's Friends. It was released in the UK on 26 April 2010, on Universal Records. It peaked at number 9 on the UK Albums Chart. It was the group's first release on a major label, as their first two CDs were self-released.

The band is from Port Isaac, a port town on the Celtic Sea, which greatly influences their music. They originally performed to tourists. The album contains many popular Cornish sea shanties and folk songs.

Track listing
CD Single

Chart performance
The album entered the UK Albums Chart on 2 May 2010, at number 9, making it their first Top 10 album.

Weekly charts

Year-end charts

References

2010 albums